Zachary Adam Neto (born January 31, 2001) is an American professional baseball shortstop in the Los Angeles Angels organization. He played college baseball for the Campbell Fighting Camels. Considered a top prospect in the 2022 MLB draft, he was selected by the Angels in the first round with the 13th overall pick.

Amateur career
Neto attended Miami Coral Park Senior High School in Miami, Florida. Unselected out of high school in the 2019 Major League Baseball draft, he enrolled at Campbell University to play college baseball for the Campbell Fighting Camels.

Neto appeared in only three games during a shortened freshman season in 2020. That summer, he played in the South Florida Collegiate Baseball League with the Delray Beach Lightning. He broke out with Campbell in 2021 and slashed .405/.488/.746 with 12 home runs, 58 RBIs, 17 doubles and 12 stolen bases over 44 starts at shortstop while also pitching 21 innings during the year, going 4-0 with a 3.43 ERA. He was named the Big South Conference Player of the Year. Following the season's end, he played in the Cape Cod Baseball League with the Brewster Whitecaps. As a redshirt sophomore in 2022, he was named Big South Player of the Year for the second straight season. Over 53 games, he batted .407 with 15 home runs, fifty RBIs, and 23 doubles. He also ended the season as a top prospect for the upcoming draft. Following the season's end, he traveled to San Diego where he participated in the Draft Combine.

Professional career
The Los Angeles Angels selected Neto in the first round with the 13th overall selection of the 2022 Major League Baseball draft. The selection made him the highest draft pick in Campbell baseball history. He signed with the team for $3.5 million. 

Neto was initially assigned to the Tri-City Dust Devils of the High-A Northwest League to begin his professional career. In seven games with the team, he batted .200 with one home run and four RBIs. On August 9, he was promoted to the Rocket City Trash Pandas of the Double-A Southern League. During a re-rank of the MLB.com Angels top 30 prospect list in mid-August, Neto was listed as the second-best prospect in the team's farm system, only behind trade deadline acquisition Logan O'Hoppe. Over 30 games with Rocket City, he batted .320 with four home runs and 23 RBIs. Between the two teams, he finished the 2022 season batting .299 with five home runs, 27 RBIs, and five stolen bases in 37 games.

References

External links
Campbell Fighting Camels bio

2001 births
Living people
Baseball players from Miami
Baseball shortstops
Brewster Whitecaps players
Campbell Fighting Camels baseball players
Rocket City Trash Pandas players
Tri-City Dust Devils players